WBRR (100.1 FM) is a radio station in Bradford, Pennsylvania. The station, operated by sister station WESB, is a classic-leaning mainstream rock format station branded as "100.1 The Hero" (HERO being a previous acronym for High Energy Rockin' Oldies). WBRR is also carried on the audio feed of Atlantic Broadband channel 11 in the Bradford and Salamanca/Little Valley, NY areas.

All staff is shared with WESB.

For most of the 1990s and early 2000s, WBRR was an oldies/classic hits outlet known as "Cool 100". In 2007, major changes were made to the morning show (adding Scott Douglas, who was previously the morning host and program director at classic rock WQRS; Douglas left the station in 2014) and minor changes to the format that people who despise variety love, and now features classic rock. In August 2008, Igor was tapped to do nights on WBRR. Igor joined after working at 100.7 WMMS and 92.3 WORM Xtreme Radio in Cleveland and Q92 WIMP in Canton, Ohio. The station subsequently moved from eighth place in the market to third, back down to eleventh before finally settling at fifth with the addition of 90's and New Old Rock.

On September 27, 2009, WBRR began airing the Jamestown, New York-based outdoor program "Grizzly Gary's Goin' Fishin' Huntin' Shootin' n Tootin'" on Sunday mornings.

WBRR is a Buffalo Bills football affiliate and a major Pittsburgh Steelers football supporter

Syndicated weekend shows can be heard weekly on WBRR:

Root Beer Power Hour Thursday 1:00am–1:35pmFloydian Slip Friday 11:00pm–12:00am
The House of Hair Saturday 8:00pm –11:00pm
Classic Rock Live Sunday 9:00am–11:00am
Chop Shop Sunday 8:00pm–10:00pm.             Chop Suey Monday 7:30pm – 9:30pm.                    Bargain Bin Igor Weekdays 6:00am – 10:00am

In March 2009 WBRR branded itself as "The Rock Station of the Twin Tiers". With the aforementioned WQRS's shift to country music and the establishment of full service/classic hits WGWE in 2010, WBRR has filled a niche as the western Twin Tiers' only rock station.

In 2011 WBRR brands itself as "The Rock Station!"

In January 2012 WBRR started streaming online at http://streamdb3web.securenetsystems.net/v5/WBRR

Awards

● Igor wins Pennsylvania 2018 FreeLancers And Broadcasters outstanding regional on air personality FLAB award
Igor wins 2 PAB 2012 Awards- Outstanding Local Radio Personality, Radio Promotional Announcement
Scott Douglas/Frank Williams win PAB's 2011 Outstanding Local Radio Personality/Team for The Morning Buzz 
Igor wins PAB's 2009 Outstanding Promotional Announcement
Frank Williams wins PAB's 2009 Outstanding Local Sports Announcer
Igor wins PAB's 2010 Outstanding Promotional Announcement
Frank Williams wins PAB's 2010 Outstanding Local Sports Announcer 
Igor win PAB's 2011 Outstanding Radio Commercial

References

External links
WBRR official Web site
WESB Inc. Web site

BRR
Mainstream rock radio stations in the United States
Radio stations established in 1987
1987 establishments in Pennsylvania